Kenneth Jenkin (born 27 November 1931) was an English professional footballer who played as a winger.

References

1931 births
Living people
Footballers from Grimsby
English footballers
Association football wingers
Grimsby Town F.C. players
English Football League players